Aman Bhushan Hajari is a Member of Legislative Assembly (MLA) representing Kusheshwar Asthan (Vidhan Sabha constituency) in the Bihar Legislative Assembly in India.  He is a member of Janata Dal (United). He was elected as the MLA on 2 November 2021.

References

Janata Dal (United) politicians
Living people
Bihar MLAs 2020–2025

People from Darbhanga 

Year of birth missing (living people)